The Arizona Hotel is a historic two-story building in Tucson, Arizona. It was built in 1917 for Luke G. Radulovich, an investor. Wells Fargo used to have a branch on the first floor. In the 1970s, the hotel was frequented by prostitutes.

The facade was designed by architect Henry O. Jaastad in the Classical Revival style in 1918, and he redesigned it in 1933. The building has been listed on the National Register of Historic Places since September 12, 2003.

References

 
Buildings and structures on the National Register of Historic Places in Arizona
National Register of Historic Places in Pima County, Arizona
Neoclassical architecture in Arizona
Commercial buildings completed in 1917